The Sacrament of the Last Supper is a painting by Salvador Dalí. Completed in 1955, after nine months of work, it remains one of his most popular compositions. Since its arrival at the National Gallery of Art in Washington, D.C. in 1955, it replaced Renoir's A Girl with a Watering Can as the most popular piece in the museum.

Background
The Sacrament of the Last Supper was completed during Dalí's post-World War II period, which is characterized by his increased interest in science, optical illusion and religion. During this time he became a devout Roman Catholic and simultaneously was astonished by the "atomic age". Dalí himself labelled this era in his work "Nuclear Mysticism". He sought to combine traditional Christian iconography with images of disintegration. This is especially apparent in his piece The Madonna of Port Lligat, which was completed six years earlier.

The painting was not commissioned. After purchasing the Crucifixion and then giving it to the Metropolitan Museum of Art, collector and banker Chester Dale told Dalí he "had to do one more religious picture". Dale believed that this picture was "too important to keep for a few" and so donated it to the National Gallery. In a paragraph in the National Gallery's curatorial file but missing from all published accounts, Dalí wrote of this picture:

Description
The Sacrament of the Last Supper depicts thirteen figures gathered around a table. Assuming this painting is in line with traditional symbolism the figures are Christ and his 12 Apostles. Christ is the central figure in the painting placed directly on the horizon line. Behind him on the intersection point of perspective rests the source of sunlight, making the Christ figure the focus of the painting. He points upward directing the viewer's attention to a dominating transparent torso with arms stretched outward spanning the width of the picture plane. The scene's setting is within a transparent dodecahedron or twelve-sided space as perceived in the pentagon-shaped windowpanes behind the table. In the background is a familiar landscape of Catalonia, which Dalí has included in his paintings numerous times, one example being his famous painting The Persistence of Memory.

Symbolism and interpretations
The combination of a classic Christian theme with the jarring techniques of surrealism captures the eye, as Dalí was able to do repeatedly with such works as The Temptation of St. Anthony, Christ of Saint John of the Cross, Crucifixion (Corpus Hypercubus), Nuclear Cross, and The Ecumenical Council, among others. The dimensions of the painting are in the golden ratio, as is the dodecahedron in the background. Dalí is quoted as saying that "the Communion must be symmetrical".

There have been many interpretations of this painting, but some critics have dismissed the piece, with the Protestant theologian Paul Tillich even calling it "junk". Michael Anthony Novak, a Catholic theologian, presented a paper on the subject of this piece in 2005. He proposes that Dalí's intention was not simply to paint the event of the last supper. He later stated:

Other critics, like Novak, say, by looking at the title, the focus is not placed on one evening two thousand years ago. The lack of individualization of the apostles, their lack of focus on Christ and the almost dematerialized Christ reach beyond the fact of the event. Some say because Christ points to himself and the floating torso above him it could possibly be that he is referring to himself as already ascended to heaven.

See also
 Last Supper in Christian art

Notes

Bibliography
Hamerman, Nora. “A New Look at Dalí’s “Sacrament”. The Catholic Herald, (October 13, 2010) accessed June 2, 2013
Novak, Michael Anthony. “Misunderstood Masterpiece.” America Magazine (November 5, 2012), accessed May 28, 2013
Novak, Michael Anthony. "Salvador Dali’s The Sacrament of the Last Supper: A Theological Re-Assessment." Conference paper, 2005, accessed March 27, 2015
Brown, David. “The Last Supper”.  A Sermon preached in Trinity College Chapel, Cambridge (February 25, 2007) accessed May 28,2013, http://www.trinitycollegechapel.com/media/filestore/sermons/BrownLastSupper250207.pdf.

External links
 National Gallery of Art, The Collection: The Sacrament of the Last Supper
 Image at Dali Gallery
 Theological analysis of the imagery

Paintings by Salvador Dalí
1955 paintings
Collections of the National Gallery of Art
Dali
Water in art